Joseph Slepian 
(February 11, 1891 – December 19, 1969)
was an American electrical engineer known for his contributions to the developments of electrical apparatus and theory.

Born in Boston, MA of Jewish Russian immigrants, he studied mathematics at Harvard University, from which he was awarded  a B.Sc. (1911), a M.Sc. (1912) and Ph.D. on the thesis On the Functions of a Complex Variable Defined by an Ordinary Differential Equation of the First Order and First Degree advised by George Birkhoff (1913).  Meanwhile, he also worked at Boston Elevated Railway.

After his Ph.D., he became  Sheldon fellow at University of Göttingen in Germany, was at University of Sorbonne in Paris, before becoming instructor of mathematics at Cornell University (1915).
He joined Westinghouse Electric in East Pittsburgh (1916)  in the railway motor department initially, moving to
the research department (1917) at Forest Hills (PA) where he became head (1922), consulting engineer (1926) and associate director
(1938–1956) and developed over two hundred patents.  Slepian did significant groundwork for the betatron (1927).
He received the IEEE Edison Medal (1947) for his work on
the autovalve lightning arrester, deion circuit breaker, and ignitron.

He wrote over 120 articles and essays, and published the book Conductivity of electricity in gases (1933).
His career was somewhat shortened by a stroke (1951).
He was the father of the mathematician David Slepian.

Awards 
 Fellow of AIEE 1927
 John Scott Medal  1932
 AIEE Lamme Medal  1942
 Westinghouse Order of Merit  1935
 French Officer de Academie 1939
 National Academy of Sciences elected member 1941
 Fellow of  the Institute of Radio Engineers  1945
 IEEE Edison Medal  1947
 Honorary doctor of engineering  Case Institute of Technology 1949
 Honorary doctor of science by the University of Leeds 1955

References

External links 
 A Biographical Memoir: Joseph Slepian 1891–1969.

1891 births
1969 deaths
People from Boston
20th-century American mathematicians
American people of Russian-Jewish descent
University of Paris alumni
Harvard University alumni
Cornell University faculty
American electrical engineers
IEEE Edison Medal recipients
Members of the United States National Academy of Sciences
Manhattan Project people
IEEE Lamme Medal recipients
20th-century American engineers
20th-century American inventors
Fellows of the American Physical Society